Tim Hovey (June 19, 1945 – September 9, 1989) was a former American child actor during the 1950s. He later became a musician, road manager and an audio engineer for rock bands.

Acting career
Born in Los Angeles, California, Hovey was discovered by a talent agent who saw his photo in the window of a photography shop. In 1955, he made his acting debut in an episode of Lassie. Later that year, he made his film debut as Tiger Flaherty opposite Charlton Heston in The Private War of Major Benson.

From 1955 to 1959, Hovey worked steadily in films and television, often playing characters younger than his real age due to his small stature. In 1957, he was signed to a film contract with Universal-International. While working at U-I, Hovey appeared in the Westerns Slim Carter and Money, Women and Guns, both opposite Jock Mahoney.

Hovey's final onscreen appearance was in an episode of the anthology series Schlitz Playhouse of the Stars, in 1959. Despite receiving an offer to appear in a Broadway play produced and directed by Otto Preminger, Hovey chose to retire from acting.

Later years
In the 1970s and 1980s, Hovey lived in Northern California and worked with computers. He was also the road manager for the rock band Grateful Dead. Hovey later learned how to play the slide guitar and would play with the band on occasion. From 1971 to 1977, Hovey served as the chief audio engineer for the Grateful Dead and Kingfish, the side project of Grateful Dead guitarist Bob Weir. He is credited as co-writer of "Important Exportin' Man" (with Dave Torbert), on the album The Adventures of Panama Red, by the New Riders of the Purple Sage.

Death
On September 9, 1989, Hovey died of an intentional drug overdose at his home in Watsonville, California. Hovey's suicide, along with the suicides of fellow former child actors Trent Lehman and Rusty Hamer, prompted Paul Petersen to form the child actor advocacy group A Minor Consideration.

Filmography

Notes

Bibliography
 Holmstrom, John. The Moving Picture Boy: An International Encyclopaedia from 1895 to 1995, Norwich, Michael Russell, 1996, pp. 253–254.
 Best, Marc. Those Endearing Young Charms: Child Performers of the Screen, South Brunswick and New York: Barnes & Co., 1971, pp. 116–121.

External links 
 
 Former Child Star Central

1945 births
1989 deaths
20th-century American male actors
20th-century American guitarists
American audio engineers
American male child actors
American male film actors
American male songwriters
American male television actors
American rock guitarists
American male guitarists
Drug-related suicides in California
Male actors from Los Angeles
Male Western (genre) film actors
People from Watsonville, California
Road crew
Slide guitarists
Songwriters from California
Guitarists from Los Angeles
Engineers from California
20th-century American engineers
20th-century American male musicians
1989 suicides